Batya Gur (1 September 1947 – 19 May 2005) was an Israeli writer. Her specialty was detective fiction. She was a 1994 recipient of the Prime Minister's Prize for Hebrew Literary Works.

Biography
Batya Gur was born in Tel Aviv in 1947 to parents who survived the Holocaust. She earned a master's degree in Hebrew literature from the Hebrew University of Jerusalem. Between 1971 and 1975 Batya lived in Greensboro, NC, where she taught Hebrew and Jewish studies to elementary students at the North Carolina Hebrew Academy at Greensboro (now called B'nai Shalom Day School).  Before writing her first detective novel at the age of 39, she taught literature at the Hebrew University Secondary School. Gur was also a literary critic for Haaretz newspaper.

Literary career
In 1988 she began writing a series starring the character of police detective Michael Ohayon: an educated, pensive, and intellectual detective. Five sequels ensued. The first book was adapted as a film for Israeli television. In every book in the series Michael Ohayon enters a closed world, an isolated society, with rules of its own (for example psychoanalysts, literary scholars in academia, or members of a kibbutz). By his fundamental approach and his inner understanding of human nature, Ohayon succeeds in breaking the ring of silence and solving the murder mystery on his way to the next book.

Critical acclaim
Gur's crime novels were described as "less about the death of the body than...sustained, thoughtful explorations of the life of the mind."

Death
On 19 May 2005, Gur died of lung cancer in Jerusalem at the age of 57. She was buried at Har HaMenuchot.

Published works

In English translation

1992 The Saturday morning murder: a psychoanalytic case
1993 Literary murder: a critical case
1994 Murder on a kibbutz: a communal case
2000 Murder duet: a musical case
2004 Bethlehem Road murder: A Michael Ohayon mystery
2006 Murder in Jerusalem: A Michael Ohayon Mystery

In Hebrew
1990 Next to the Hunger Road (essays)1994 I Didn't Imagine it Would Be This Way1998 Stone for Stone1999 A Spy in the House2000 Requiem for Humility or Living in Jerusalem''

See also
Women of Israel

References 

1947 births
2005 deaths
Academic staff of the Open University of Israel
Hebrew University of Jerusalem alumni
Haaretz
Writers from Tel Aviv
Israeli literary critics
Israeli women literary critics
Crime novelists
Crime fiction writers
Israeli women novelists
Israeli crime fiction writers
Women mystery writers
Israeli women essayists
20th-century Israeli novelists
21st-century Israeli novelists
20th-century essayists
21st-century essayists
20th-century Israeli women writers
21st-century Israeli women writers
Recipients of Prime Minister's Prize for Hebrew Literary Works
Deaths from lung cancer in Israel
Burials at Har HaMenuchot